Lutra is a genus of otters, one of seven in the subfamily Lutrinae.

Taxonomy and evolution
The genus includes these species:

Extant species

Extinct species 

†Lutra affinis
†Lutra bressana 
†Lutra bravardi
†Lutra castiglionis
†Lutra euxena
†Lutra fatimazohrae
†Lutra franconica
†Lutra palaeindica
†Lutra simplicidens
†Lutra trinacriae

The genus most likely evolved in Asia during the late Pliocene epoch; the oldest fossil belonging to the genus is of the species L. palaeindica, and dates from the late Pliocene.

Habitat
Lutra species are semiaquatic mammals, so they are well-adapted to both water and land. They prefer shallow, narrow areas of streams surrounded by mature trees and with rocks, especially where weirs reduce the flow of the water, as well as attract fishes.  They seem to tolerate roads and residential and agricultural areas, but only moderate human interaction. They clearly avoid areas without vegetation cover and rocks.

Diet

The otters' diets consist mainly of fish (hence, the aquatic environment). However, during the winter and in colder environments, fish consumption is significantly lower and the otters use other resources for their food supply. Their diets can consist of amphibians (mainly frogs and pond turtles), bird predation (mainly anserine species), small rodents, and invertebrates such as water beetles, snails, and crayfish. They have also feed on plants, specifically grasses. With this large diversity of prey and resources for their diets, otters are considered "opportunistic eaters".

Behavior

Some otters live in solitude, while others live in groups.

References

Otters
Mammal genera
 
Taxa named by Mathurin Jacques Brisson